Curacao (pronounced Koo-ra-sao), formerly La Curacao, is a large-format retail store chain and finance company with export, travel and money transfer services. Founded in 1978, Curacao is headquartered in Los Angeles with retail locations in California, Arizona and Nevada.

Services
Curacao serves a diverse array of customers. A large percentage of its credit card holders include Hispanic and Latino American consumers. Every store features English/Spanish-language advertisements and bilingual salesclerks. Curacao sells most of its merchandise on credit, and has opened accounts for over two million private label cardholders. The company's services also include Curacao Travel, Curacao Money Transfer, and Curacao Export. The company's mission is said to be to improve people’s lives by providing them access to products and services using Curacao’s proprietary credit while supporting the communities it serves. In 2002, the Curacao Foundation was established with programs focused on providing home goods, free services, financial, health and immigration education and resources.

Addresses
 Los Angeles
1605 West Olympic Boulevard,
Los Angeles CA 90015 +1 213-639-2100

Huntington Park
5980 Pacific Boulevard
Huntington Park CA 90255 +1 323-826-3000

Santa Ana 
16111 Harbor Boulevard Fountain Valley 
CA 92708 +1 714-775-9700

Anaheim
1520 Lemon Street
Anaheim CA 92801 +1 714-738-4900

Northridge
9301 Tampa Avenue Suite 545
Northridge CA 91324 +1 818-672-7023

Panorama City
8401 Van Nuys Boulevard #63
Panorama City CA 91402 +1 818-830-6500

Lynwood 
3160 East Imperial Highway
Lynwood CA 90262 +1 310-632-7711

Chino
5459 Philadelphia Street
Chino CA 91710 +1 909-628-1919

Tucson
3390 South 6th Avenue
Tucson AZ 85713 +1 520-576-5565 
Tucson 
Mall 4500 N Oracle Rd
Tucson, AZ 85705 COMING SOON

South Gate 
8618 Garfield Avenue
South Gate CA 90280 +1 562-927-3027

San Bernardino
885 Harriman Place
San Bernardino CA 92408, +1 909-383-5099

Phoenix 
7815 West Thomas Road
Phoenix AZ 85033 +1 623-848-0040

Las Vegas
4200 Meadows Lane
Las Vegas NV 89107 +1 702-822-6891

Chula Vista
Mall 555 Broadway Suite 1019
Chula Vista, CA 91910 COMING SOON

History

Founding
Curacao began as a consumer-product door-to-door sales company, in Burbank, California. It became popular among the Latino community who did not have access to credit. Salesmen allowed customers to buy their goods by placing a down payment and then returning to the customer's residence to collect payments on a regular basis. This service eventually evolved into Curacao's proprietary credit business.

Expansion 
In 1983, La Curacao moved to the Pico-Union district in Los Angeles. By 1984, it had opened its export division, which allowed customers to shop for goods and have them shipped to their families in Mexico and Central America. During the Los Angeles Riots in 1992,  the original store was burned down and its inventory destroyed. Two weeks later, the business reopened at its flagship location of 1605 W. Olympic Blvd.

In 1995,  La Curacao opened its second store, in the Panorama City district of the San Fernando Valley. Inside the Panorama Mall, the new store featured Mesoamerican style decor and child care. The company also purchased the office tower at 1605 West Olympic Boulevard, now the La Curacao Business Center, where its headquarters are now situated.

By 2007, the Curacao stores had ten locations in the Southwestern United States, with nine stores in California and two in Arizona.

In 2012, La Curacao was renamed Curacao, undergoing complete rebranding to cater to the second and third generation millennial Latino consumer.

Curacao currently has locations in Los Angeles, Panorama City, South Gate, Huntington Park, San Bernardino, Lynwood, Santa Ana, Chino, Phoenix, Anaheim, Tucson, Las Vegas and Northridge.

Initiatives
The retailer is looking to continue adding new store locations across California and expand to more U.S. states by 2022.

Export
Export is one of Curacao's services. Customers can purchase a product in the United States and have it delivered to countries in Central America and Mexico. The company has its own warehouses and distribution centers in Mexico and Central America and operates a home-delivery program.

Travel 
Curacao’s Travel agency books over 20,000 trips a year on their proprietary credit card for services ranging from airline tickets, hotels, travel packages and cruises to specialized tours and entertainment venues.

Money Transfer 
Curacao’s Money Transfer affiliate makes it possible for customers to send over 175,000 international money transfers per year, on credit, by visiting Curacao stores or using the Curacao Money Transfer app.

References

Consumer electronics retailers in the United States
Furniture retailers of the United States
Retail companies based in California
Companies based in Los Angeles
American companies established in 1978
Retail companies established in 1978
1978 establishments in California

money transfer services